Western Colorado Mountaineers 
 

Shane Bannister Carwin (born January 4, 1975) is an American former mixed martial artist who competed in the Heavyweight division of the Ultimate Fighting Championship (UFC). He is a former Interim UFC Heavyweight Champion. He is considered to be one of the hardest hitting athletes to ever fight in the UFC.

Background
Carwin and his two brothers were raised by his mother, who had the goal of getting all her sons college educations. He started wrestling when he was six years old. He received a bachelor's degree in mechanical engineering from the Colorado School of Mines as well as a bachelor's degree in environmental technology from Western State College. Carwin became an engineer out of college and continued to work in that field while pursuing his MMA career.

Carwin wrestled in college, becoming a two-time NCAA Division II Wrestling National Runner-Up as a heavyweight in 1996 and 1997, and the NCAA II Wrestling Heavyweight National Champion in 1999. He was also a two-time All-American in football for Western State and was chosen to participate in the Senior Bowl. Carwin is also a volunteer wrestling coach for the University of Northern Colorado.

Mixed martial arts career
Carwin  made his professional debut at WEC 17, winning his first eight fights by first round stoppage and became the Ring of Fire Heavyweight Champion before signing with the UFC.

Ultimate Fighting Championship
Carwin made his UFC debut on the undercard of UFC 84 against Christian Wellisch. He won the match via one punch knockout 44 seconds into the first round, demonstrating his punching power by sending Wellisch's mouthpiece flying across the octagon. Carwin followed up with an appearance in Birmingham, England at UFC 89 against Neil Wain, winning another one sided fight via TKO at 1:31 of the first round. At UFC 96, Carwin took a major step up in competition when he faced former number one contender and renowned Brazilian jiu-jitsu black belt Gabriel Gonzaga. After being stunned by a flurry of punches, Carwin knocked Gonzaga unconscious with a short right hand at 1:09 of the first round.

Carwin was then set to face fellow undefeated heavyweight contender Cain Velasquez at UFC 104, with the winner getting a title shot against then-champion Brock Lesnar; however, the UFC reconsidered the bout and Carwin was confirmed to fight for the title at UFC 106 on November 21, 2009. The fight was later postponed after Lesnar pulled out due to illness, with UFC 108 a likely date. Lesnar then pulled out of that fight on October 26, and Dana White reported at the UFC 105 post-fight press conference that Lesnar was too ill to compete and was expected to be out for the first half of 2010 while recovering from an intestinal disorder and subsequent surgery.

Carwin fought former UFC Heavyweight Champion Frank Mir for the UFC Interim Heavyweight Championship on March 27, 2010, at UFC 111. Carwin stated on his website that, "Mir is a legend of the sport, and I would be honored to fight him." Early in the first round, Carwin dropped Mir with multiple uppercuts from the clinch. Carwin then followed Mir to the ground, took back mount and rained down heavy punches on Mir's head thus winning the fight via knockout to become the UFC Interim Heavyweight Champion. The bout also marked the longest fight of Carwin's career at three minutes and 48 seconds; his previous mark was his MMA debut against Carlton Jones, with a time of 2 minutes and 11 seconds. Following UFC 111, Beau Dure of USA Today compared Carwin to Mike Tyson, echoing a similar comparison made prior to the event by Mark Wayne of Fightline.com.

Carwin then went on to face Brock Lesnar for the undisputed UFC Heavyweight Championship at UFC 116. He dominated the first round, knocking Lesnar down and unleashing a relentless ground and pound attack to a visibly stunned Lesnar. However, in the second round, Lesnar took an exhausted Carwin down and applied an arm-triangle choke, forcing Carwin to submit.

Carwin was scheduled to face former IFL Heavyweight Champion Roy Nelson on January 1, 2011, at UFC 125; however, he later announced on his website that he would pull out of the fight due to back and neck pain, which required surgery that took place on November 2, 2010. Carwin later stated that the neck surgery was a success. On January 3, 2011, Carwin posted a blog entry on his website, stating that he had just begun his first day of training since his neck surgery, hoping to be back in the octagon by May or June 2011.
Carwin was expected to face promotional newcomer Jon Olav Einemo on June 11, 2011, at UFC 131. However, another bout with diverticulitis sidelined Brock Lesnar, so Carwin agreed to step in to the main event to fight Junior dos Santos.  Carwin was defeated by Dos Santos via unanimous decision (30–27, 30–27, and 30–26). This fight was the first in Carwin's career to ever go to a decision.

On September 9, 2011, Carwin posted a blog entry on his website stating that he was 100% healthy and looking to return to the octagon in late December or early January. On October 16, 2011, it was revealed that Carwin would need back surgery. He was expected to be out until mid-2012. However, his recovery took longer than expected, and he was targeting a return to fighting that fall.

On Thursday July 12, 2012, Dana White announced that Carwin and Roy Nelson had been picked as the next coaches for the 16th season of The Ultimate Fighter (TUF) and were expected to face each other on December 15, 2012, at The Ultimate Fighter: Team Carwin vs. Team Nelson Finale. However, on November 14, 2012, Dana White revealed on Twitter that Carwin injured his knee and would not be facing Nelson in the TUF finale.

On May 7, 2013, Carwin announced his retirement from mixed martial arts (MMA) after enduring several injuries since his last fight on June 11, 2011.

MMA return
On July 26, 2016, Carwin announced his plans to return to MMA, five years since his last competitive bout. On September 7, 2016, Carwin announced that he had worked with his management team at Ingrained Media to secure his release from the UFC and became a free agent. On October 28, 2016, Carwin announced he had signed with Rizin Fighting Federation. He stated that he expected to debut on their December 29, 2016, card, but later withdrew with injury.

In late 2017, Carwin was in negotiations with Bellator MMA but nothing came to fruition, despite his injuries being rehabilitated.

Boxing career
On October 15, 2016, Carwin participated in a boxing exhibition match against professional skateboarder Jason Ellis at EllisMania 13. Per the unique rules, Carwin had one of his arms duct-taped to his body to box Ellis. He won the bout via knockout in the second round.

Personal life
Carwin is divorced and has a son from a previous marriage. He has a daughter born in February 2010.

Championships and accomplishments

Mixed martial arts
Ultimate Fighting Championship
Interim UFC Heavyweight Championship (One time)
Knockout of the Night (One time) 
Ring of Fire
ROF Heavyweight Championship (One time)

Amateur wrestling
National Collegiate Athletic Association
NCAA Division II Wrestling Hall of Fame (2011)
NCAA Division II Wrestling Heavyweight Champion (1999)
NCAA Division II National Wrestling Heavyweight Runner-Up (1996, 1997) 
NCAA Division II All American (1996, 1997, 1999) 
Western State College
Western State College Mountaineer Sports Hall of Fame (2004)
Rocky Mountain Athletic Conference
Rocky Mountain Athletic Conference Hall of Fame (2010)

Mixed martial arts record

| Loss
|align=center| 12–2
|Junior dos Santos
| Decision (unanimous)
| UFC 131
| 
|align=center| 3
|align=center| 5:00
| Vancouver, British Columbia, Canada
| 
|-
| Loss
|align=center| 12–1
|Brock Lesnar
| Submission (arm-triangle choke)
| UFC 116
| 
|align=center| 2
|align=center| 2:19
| Las Vegas, Nevada, United States
| 
|-
| Win
|align=center| 12–0
|Frank Mir
| KO (punches)
| UFC 111
| 
|align=center| 1
|align=center| 3:48
| Newark, New Jersey, United States
| 
|-
| Win
|align=center| 11–0
|Gabriel Gonzaga
| KO (punch)
| UFC 96
| 
|align=center| 1
|align=center| 1:09
| Columbus, Ohio, United States
| 
|-
| Win
|align=center| 10–0
|Neil Wain
| TKO (punches)
| UFC 89
| 
|align=center| 1
|align=center| 1:31
| Birmingham, England, United Kingdom
| 
|-
| Win
|align=center| 9–0
|Christian Wellisch
| KO (punch)
| UFC 84
| 
|align=center| 1
|align=center| 0:44
| Las Vegas, Nevada, United States
| 
|-
| Win
|align=center| 8–0
|Sherman Pendergarst
| TKO (punches)
| ROF 31: Undisputed
| 
|align=center| 1
|align=center| 1:41
| Broomfield, Colorado, United States
| 
|-
| Win
|align=center| 7–0
|Rex Richards
| Submission (standing guillotine choke)
| Art of War 4
| 
|align=center| 1
|align=center| 1:24
| Tunica, Mississippi, United States
| 
|-
| Win
|align=center| 6–0
|Rick Slaton
| KO (punch)
| ROF 30: Domination
| 
|align=center| 1
|align=center| 0:49
| Broomfield, Colorado, United States
| 
|-
| Win
|align=center| 5–0
|Chris Guillen
| Submission (rear-naked choke)
| Ultimate Texas Showdown 6
| 
|align=center| 1
|align=center| 0:29
| Frisco, Texas, United States
| 
|-
| Win
|align=center| 4–0
|Justice Smith
| TKO (punches)
| Extreme Wars 3: Bay Area Brawl
| 
|align=center| 1
|align=center| 0:31
| Oakland, California, United States
| 
|-
| Win
|align=center| 3–0
|Jay McCown
| Submission (rear-naked choke)
| Ultimate Texas Showdown 5
| 
|align=center| 1
|align=center| 1:31
| Frisco, Texas, United States
| 
|-
| Win
|align=center| 2–0
|Casey Jackson
| Submission (guillotine choke)
| Extreme Wars 2: X-1
| 
|align=center| 1
|align=center| 0:22
| Honolulu, Hawaii, United States
| 
|-
| Win
|align=center| 1–0
|Carlton Jones
| TKO (submission to punches)
| WEC 17
| 
|align=center| 1
|align=center| 2:11
| Lemoore, California, United States
|

See also
 List of current UFC fighters

References

External links
Shane Carwin Profile at the National Wrestling Hall of Fame
Shane Carwin's Blog
MiddleEasy.com Interview

1975 births
Living people
American male mixed martial artists
Mixed martial artists from Colorado
Heavyweight mixed martial artists
American practitioners of Brazilian jiu-jitsu
Colorado Mines Orediggers wrestlers
Colorado School of Mines alumni
Western Colorado University alumni
Ultimate Fighting Championship champions
Ultimate Fighting Championship male fighters
American male sport wrestlers
Mixed martial artists utilizing boxing
Mixed martial artists utilizing collegiate wrestling
Mixed martial artists utilizing Brazilian jiu-jitsu